In the field of organic chemistry, a polycyclic compound is an organic compound featuring several closed rings of atoms, primarily carbon. These ring substructures include cycloalkanes, aromatics, and other ring types. They come in sizes of three atoms and upward, and in combinations of linkages that include tethering (such as in biaryls), fusing (edge-to-edge, such as in anthracene and steroids), links via a single atom (such as in spiro compounds), bridged compounds, and longifolene. Though poly- literally means "many", there is some latitude in determining how many rings are required to be considered polycyclic; many smaller rings are described by specific prefixes (e.g., bicyclic, tricyclic, tetracyclic, etc.), and so while it can refer to these, the title term is used with most specificity when these alternative names and prefixes are unavailable.

In general, the term polycyclic includes polycyclic aromatic compounds, including polycyclic aromatic hydrocarbons, as well as heterocyclic aromatic compounds with multiple rings (where heteroaromatic compounds are aromatic compounds that contain sulfur, nitrogen, oxygen, or another non-carbon atoms in their rings in addition to carbon).

An example of a polycyclic compound based on a nitrogen cage is hexanitrohexaazaisowurtzitane.

Naming
There is a scheme for naming polycyclic compounds using square brackets [] and numbers.

See also
Polycyclic aromatic compound
Polycyclic aromatic hydrocarbon

References